In fashion and clothing, a petite size is a U.S. standard clothing size. Petite sizes are designed for women  and under, regardless of their physical body shape or weight.

Many clothing stores cater their petite sized styles to people who are 163 cm (5 ft 4 in) or shorter.

Frequency

See also

 Children's clothing
 Clothing sizes
 US standard clothing size
 EN 13402

References

 NHANES survey
 CDC Anthropometric Reference Data for Children and Adults: U.S. Population, 1999–2002 - Page 20, Table 19.

Sizes in clothing
Fashion design